Nozay may refer to the following places in France:
 Nozay, Aube (in north-central France)
 Nozay, Essonne (close to Paris)
 Nozay, Loire-Atlantique (in western France)